Grayridge is a census-designated place in eastern Stoddard County, Missouri, United States. It is located approximately ten miles southwest of Sikeston, just south of U.S. Route 60.

A post office called Gray's Ridge was established in 1879, the name was changed to Gray Ridge in 1887, and the present name of Grayridge was adopted in 1894. The community has the name of W. C. Gray, a pioneer citizen.

Grayridge is home to Stoddard County Oilseed Crushing, which is developing biodiesel.

As of 2011, Grayridge's population was 122.

Demographics

References

Census-designated places in Missouri
Census-designated places in Stoddard County, Missouri
1879 establishments in Missouri